Podljubelj ( or) is a settlement on the road to the Ljubelj Pass in the Municipality of Tržič in the Upper Carniola region of Slovenia.

Name
The name of the settlement was changed from Sveta Ana pod Ljubeljem (literally, 'Saint Anne below Ljubelj') to Podljubelj (literally, 'below Ljubelj') in 1955. The name was changed on the basis of the 1948 Law on Names of Settlements and Designations of Squares, Streets, and Buildings as part of efforts by Slovenia's postwar communist government to remove religious elements from toponyms. In the past the German name was Sankt Anna.

Church
The local church, dedicated to Saint Anne, stands right by the entrance to the Ljubelj Tunnel.

Tominc Falls

On White Creek, a right tributary of Mošenik Creek, there is an easily reachable  waterfall called Tominc Falls. It is a tourist attraction during high-flow conditions.

Mine
In the hamlet of Lajba above the village is an abandoned cinnabar mine called Saint Anne's Mine and parts of it have been made accessible to visitors.

References

External links

Podljubelj at Geopedia

Populated places in the Municipality of Tržič
Austria–Slovenia border crossings